Blerimas is a village in the Vlorë County, southern Albania. It is part of the municipality Delvinë. The village is inhabited by Muslim Albanians.

References

Populated places in Delvinë
Villages in Vlorë County